Hemley Boum (born 1973 in Douala, Cameroon) is a Cameroonian writer. She received the Grand prix littéraire d'Afrique noire. She won the Prix Les Afriques in 2016.

Boum studied Social Sciences at the Catholic University of Central Africa in Yaoundé and international trade at the Lille Catholic University. She lives in Paris with her husband and their two children.

Works
 Le Clan des femmes, Paris, L'Harmattan, " Écrire l'Afrique ", 2010 
 Si d'aimer…, Ciboure, La Cheminante, 2012 
 Les maquisards, Ciboure, La Cheminante, 2015 
 Les jours viennent et passent, Paris, Gallimard, 2019,  (Translation in Dutch: De dagen komen en gaan, 2020)

External links
 www.lacheminante.fr/si-daimer
 www.lacheminante.fr/les-maquisards

References

1973 births
Cameroonian women
Cameroonian women writers
Cameroonian writers in French
Living people
Cameroonian women novelists
People from Douala
Cameroonian emigrants to France
Cameroonian novelists
21st-century Cameroonian writers
21st-century Cameroonian women writers